Denis Donnelly (1937 – 27 October 2008) was an Irish Gaelic footballer and hurler who played for club sides Skryne and Kilmessan and at inter-county level with the Meath senior teams in both codes. He usually lined out as a full-back.

Career

Donnelly lined out for the Meath senior teams as a dual player. He was captain of the senior football team that won the Leinster Championship in 1964. Donnelly also filled the right corner-back position on the Meath team that was beaten by Galway in the 1966 All-Ireland final. He also won two Leinster Junior Championships with the Meath senior hurling team. At club level, Donnelly was a member of the Skryne team that won the Meath SFC title in 1965. He also won four Meath SHC titles with sister club Kilmeassan. Donnelly was the joint-winner of the All-Ireland Poc Fada Championship in 1963.

Personal life and death

Donnelly spent his entire working life as a farmer. His son, David Donnelly, also lined out with the Meath senior hurling team. Donnelly died after a period of illness at Our Lady's Hospital in Navan on 27 October 2008.

Honours

Kilmessan
Meath Senior Hurling Championship: 1961, 1962, 1965, 1969

Skryne
Meath Senior Football Championship: 1965 

Meath
Leinster Senior Football Championship: 1964 (c), 1966
Leinster Junior Hurling Championship: 1961, 1972

References

1937 births
2008 deaths
Kilmessan hurlers
Skryne Gaelic footballers
Meath inter-county Gaelic footballers
Meath inter-county hurlers